The 1986 Jade Solid Gold Best Ten Music Awards Presentation was held in January 1987. It is part of the Jade Solid Gold Best Ten Music Awards Presentation series held in Hong Kong.

Top 10 song awards 
The top 10 songs (十大勁歌金曲) of 1986 are as follows.

Additional awards

References 
 Top ten songs award 1986, Tvcity.tvb.com
 Additional awards 1986, Tvcity.tvb.com

Jade Solid Gold Best Ten Music Awards
Jade Solid Gold Best Ten Music Awards Presentation, 1986